John Montague "Towser" Gosden (1904–20 October 1967) was a British racehorse trainer based near Lewes, East Sussex.

He won a number of important races, although his career was interrupted by the Second World War. He trained Epsom Derby winner Charlottown as a two-year-old, and won the King George VI and Queen Elizabeth Stakes with Aggressor.

He is the father of British racehorse trainer John Gosden.

Personal life

He married Peggy Gosden (née Gearing), with whom he had two children, John and Sally.

See also

John Gosden

References

1904 births
1967 deaths
British racehorse trainers